This is a list of feature films originally released and/or distributed by Lionsgate.

Lists 
The films are divided into lists by decade: 
 List of Lionsgate films (1997–1999)
 List of Lionsgate films (2000–2009)
 List of Lionsgate films (2010–2019)
 List of Lionsgate films (2020–2029)

See also
 Roadside Attractions

External links
Lionsgate Publicity website
Upcoming Movies from Lionsgate at Box Office Mojo
Lionsgate Box Office History at The Numbers

Lionsgate
Lionsgate